The Symphony No. 2 in E minor and C major by Arnold Bax was completed in 1926, after he had worked on it for two years. It was dedicated to Serge Koussevitzky, who conducted the first two performances of the work on 13 and 14 December 1929.

Instrumentation
It is scored for piccolo, three flutes, two oboes, English horn, three clarinets, bass clarinet, two bassoons, double bassoon, four horns, three trumpets, two tenor trombones, bass trombone, euphonium, bass tuba, timpani, bass drum, tambourine, cymbals, xylophone, glockenspiel, celesta, piano, two harps, organ and strings.

Form
It is in three movements:

Molto moderato - Allegro moderato
Andante
Poco largamente - Allegro feroce - Molto largamente

Overview
The opening movement is noted for its complex orchestration. The orchestra is unusually large for Bax, with the organ used solely for pedals to add a dark effect. The thematic material for the entire symphony is laid out in the Molto moderato introduction of the first movement. The Allegro moderato section which follows is a further development of the introductory material, as is the more lyrical second subject. The movement ends with the sonorous theme which was first stated by the lower woodwinds at the beginning of the symphony. A typical performance of this movement lasts 16 minutes.

The second movement begins with an ostinato on harp and the flutes, which eventually develops into a beautiful melody that forms a basis for the development of the movement. A quotation of Bax's tone poem In Memoriam is used, and motifs are quoted from the opening movement of the symphony. A typical performance of this movement lasts 12 minutes.

The final movement continues to use the main thematic material, with a short Poco largamente introduction followed by a fast, furious Allegro feroce section. A direct quotation from the first movement is used, the main climax of the piece is reached just before the epilogue in which the symphony fades into unresolved tranquility. A typical performance of this movement lasts 11 minutes.

Notable recordings
Myer Fredman conducting the London Philharmonic Orchestra
David Lloyd-Jones conducting the Royal Scottish National Orchestra
Vernon Handley conducting the BBC Philharmonic

Symphonies by Arnold Bax
1926 symphonies
Music for orchestra and organ
1926 compositions
Compositions in E minor
Compositions in C major
Music dedicated to ensembles or performers